In Greek mythology, Aëtos is an earth-born childhood companion of Zeus, the king of the gods, who served as the origin of the Eagle of Zeus, the most prominent symbol of the god of thunder.

Mythology 
According to the myth, Aëtos was a beautiful boy born of the earth. While Zeus was young and hiding in Crete from his father Cronus who had devoured all of Zeus's siblings, Aëtos became friends with the god and was the first one to swear fealty to him as new king. But years later, after Zeus had overthrown his father and become king in his place, Zeus's wife Hera turned Aëtos into an eagle, out of fear that Zeus loved him. Thus the eagle became the sacred bird of Zeus, and a symbol of power and kingship. The eagle even assisted Zeus during the Gigantomachy, by placing lightning bolts on Zeus's hands. A similar tale was sometimes attributed to Ganymede, Zeus's cupbearer and eromenos, whom Zeus abducted in the form of an eagle.

See also 

 Periphas
 Argus Panoptes
 Daphne

References

Bibliography 
 
 Maurus Servius Honoratus, In Vergilii carmina comentarii. Servii Grammatici qui feruntur in Vergilii carmina commentarii; recensuerunt Georgius Thilo et Hermannus Hagen. Georgius Thilo. Leipzig. B. G. Teubner. 1881. Online version at the Perseus Digital Library.

External links 
 EAGLE OF ZEUS from the Theoi Project

Deeds of Zeus
Cretan characters in Greek mythology
Children of Gaia
Deeds of Hera
Metamorphoses into birds in Greek mythology